Michael or Mike Dunne may refer to:

 Mike Dunne (journalist) (1949–2007), American writer
 Mick Dunne (1929–2002), Irish sports journalist
 Mike Dunne (baseball) (born 1962), American baseball player
 Michael Dunne (MP), Member of the UK Parliament for Queen's County (1852–1865)
 Stephen Dunne (actor) (1918–1977), American actor sometimes credited as Michael Dunne

See also
 
 Michael Dunn (disambiguation)